Takkari  is a 2007 Indian Telugu-language film directed by Amma Rajashekhar. The film stars Nithiin and Sadha. It is a remake of  Tamil language film, Thiruvilaiyaadal Aarambam. The film was later dubbed in Malayalam as Gambler and in Hindi as Meri Ladai in 2008.

Plot
Tirupathi (Nithiin) is a brilliant man who wants to become a realtor, much to the chagrin of his father (Chandra Mohan), who doesn't support his goal. Eventually Tirupati wins the heart of a rich girl, Priya (Sadha), sister of a business tycoon and villainous Guru (Sayaji Shinde). He realizes his ambition in real estate. The Guru wants him to drop his sister; Tirupati in return demands money. The villain gives him a cheque from a dubious bank. However, Tirupathi gets his money as he blackmails the heroine's brother, threatening to expose some photos. The villain also plans an IT raid on Tirupathi's companies. However, that plan backfires. Then Guru tries to get his sister married to another, but the hero marries her. The story ends with Tirupathi returning all the money taken from the Guru, who finally accepts the marriage.

Cast
 Nithiin as Tirupathi 
 Sadha as Priya 
 Sayaji Shinde as Guru
 Chandra Mohan as Tirupathi's father
 Raghu Babu as Muthukrishna 
 Venu Madhav
 Ali
 Sudha
 Uttej as Bus conductor

Soundtrack

The soundtrack of the film was composed by Chakri.

Release
Y. Sunita Chowdary of The Hindu noted that "Takkari looks to be exactly what it promises to be-Nitin’s return to form".

References

External links
 

2000s Telugu-language films
2007 films
Telugu remakes of Tamil films
Films scored by Chakri